DeSoto Central High School is a public high school in Southaven, Mississippi, United States. It is a part of the DeSoto County School District and serves students from Southaven, Olive Branch, and Nesbit.

History
DeSoto Central High School opened in August 1999 as a Kindergarten-6th grade campus in the current DeSoto Central Middle School Building to relieve crowding at Southaven High School and Olive Branch High School. DeSoto Central received a new high school building in August 2003. The first senior class graduated in May 2006.

Athletics

Teams
Desoto Central's athletic teams are nicknamed the Jaguars and the school's colors are purple and gold. DeSoto Central teams compete in the following sports:

Archery
Band
Baseball
Basketball
Bowling
Cross Country
Football 
Golf
Powerlifting
Soccer
Softball
Swimming
Tennis
Track and Field
Volleyball

State championships
Baseballs
2015 Mississippi 6A State Champions
2019 Mississippi 6A State Champions 
Marching Band
2010 Mississippi 6A State Champions
2011 Mississippi 6A State Champions
2021 Mississippi 6A State Champions

Demographics
64.5% of the student population at DeSoto Central High School identify as Caucasian, 28.8% identify as African American, 3.5% identify as Asian, and 3% identify as Hispanic. The student body makeup is 49.25% male and 50.75% female.

Notable alumni
Austin Riley, MLB player for the Atlanta Braves
Ricky Stenhouse Jr. Nascar Driver.

References

External links
 

Public high schools in Mississippi
Southaven, Mississippi
Schools in DeSoto County, Mississippi
Educational institutions established in 1999
1999 establishments in Mississippi